ACO, AcO, or Aco may refer to:

Organizations
 Accountable care organization, healthcare organization characterized by a specific payment and care delivery model
 Aco Records, a British 1920s record label
 ACO, C.A., a Venezuelan holding company
 Air Cadet Organisation, collective name for the UK cadet forces sponsored by the Royal Air Force
 The Airline Cooperative, an organization of international airlines formed in 2012
 Allied Command Operations, the NATO strategic command
 Alvarez Chamber Orchestra
 American Composers Orchestra
 American Cornhole Organization
 Arts Center of the Ozarks, community theater in Springdale, Arkansas, US
 Association of Cricket Officials
 Australian Chamber Orchestra
 Australian College of Optometry
 Automobile Club de l'Ouest, organizers of the 24 Hours of Le Mans auto race
 Avenir du Congo, a political party in the Democratic Republic of the Congo
 Canadian Association of Orthodontists (Association canadienne des orthodontistes, ACO)

Places
 Aco District, Concepción, Peru
 Aco District, Corongo, Peru

People
 Aco (given name), a list of people
 Michel Aco, French explorer in North America
 Aco (musician) (born 1977), Japanese female singer

Other uses
 Abell catalog of rich clusters of galaxies (ACO)
 Acetoxy group (AcO), a chemical functional group
 All-trans-8'-apo-beta-carotenal 15,15'-oxygenase, an enzyme
 Analog Coherent Optical module (CFP2-ACO), an interoperability agreement produced by the Optical Internetworking Forum
 Animal control officer, a qualified person in the Animal control service
 Ant colony optimization, a computer algorithm
 Accountable care organization, a type of health system model

See also

 ACCO (disambiguation)
 Acho, a surname
 Acos (disambiguation)
 Akko (disambiguation)
 Ako (disambiguation)
 CO (disambiguation)